Indian Banks' Association (IBA), formed on (26 September 1946) as a representative body of management of banking in India operating in India - an association of Indian banks and financial institutions based in Mumbai. With an initial membership representing 22 banks in India in 1946, IBA currently represents 247 banking companies operating in India. IBA was formed for development, coordination and strengthening of Indian banking, and assist the member banks in various ways including implementation of new systems and adoption of standards among the members.

Indian Banks' Association is managed by a managing committee, and the current managing committee consists of one chairman, 3 deputy chairmen, 1 honorary secretary and 26 members.

On 20 November 2020, Union Bank of India's MD & CEO Rajkiran Rai was elected as the new Chairman of IBA. Mr.Dinesh Khara, Chairman of State Bank of India, Mr.Madhav Nair, Country Head & CEO of Mashreq Bank and Mr.S. S. Mallikarjuna Rao MD & CEO of Punjab National Bank were elected as Deputy Chairmen. Mr.Rakesh Sharma MD & CEO of IDBI Bank was elected as the Honorary Secretary for 2020-21. The Chief Executive of IBA is Mr.Sunil Mehta and Dy Chief Executive Mr.Gopal Bhagat.

Managing committee
The banks which are members of the managing committee of the IBA include:

Citibank
Indian Bank
Indian Overseas Bank
Punjab National Bank
Union Bank of India
Central Bank of India
State Bank of India
Bank of Baroda
Canara Bank
Mashreq Bank
Bank of America
Standard Chartered Bank
UCO Bank
IDBI Bank
Qatar National Bank
JPMorgan Chase Bank
Punjab & Sind Bank
Bank of Maharashtra

Private Sector Banks
ICICI Bank
South Indian Bank
Karnataka Bank
City Union Bank
Federal Bank

Co-operative Sector Banks
Saraswat Co-operative Bank Ltd
  Nagpur Nagarik Sahakari Bank Ltd.
   A. P. Mahesh Co-operative Urban Bank Ltd.

Payments Banks and Small Finance Banks
Equitas Small Finance Bank

References

External links 
Official site
https://www.business-standard.com/article/pti-stories/iba-elects-pnb-s-sunil-mehta-as-chairman-118083100771_1.html
http://www.thehindu.com/business/Industry/sbi-five-associate-banks-bmb-merge-with-sbi/article17757316.ece
https://www.thehindu.com/business/rajnish-kumar-is-new-iba-chairman/article29738120.ece
categories: Banking in India | Consumer protection in India

Trade associations based in India
Banking in India
Bankers associations
1946 establishments in India